Alan Gibson Stewart (born 28 March 1938) is a former Australian politician. He was the Labor member for Manly in the New South Wales Legislative Assembly from 1978 to 1984.

Born in Manly, Stewart attended public schools at Harbord and Manly, and then St Aloysius College. He studied at Sydney Technical College, Wagga Agricultural College and Macquarie University, where he received a Bachelor of Arts and a Master of Science. At Griffith University he was awarded a PhD in Environmental Science. He served as President of the Harbord branch the Australian Labor Party and a delegate to the Manly State Electoral Council. Stewart is the author of two books: Hard Row to Hoe and Persian Expedition.

In 1978, Stewart won the traditionally Liberal seat of Manly after sitting member Douglas Darby's retirement. He narrowly held the seat in 1981, but was defeated by David Hay in 1984.

References

 

1938 births
Living people
Members of the New South Wales Legislative Assembly
Australian Labor Party members of the Parliament of New South Wales
People from Manly, New South Wales